Events from the year 1986 in Taiwan, Republic of China. This year is numbered Minguo 75 according to the official Republic of China calendar.

Incumbents
 President – Chiang Ching-kuo
 Vice President – Lee Teng-hui
 Premier – Yu Kuo-hwa
 Vice Premier – Lin Yang-kang

Events

January
 1 January – The establishment of National Museum of Natural Science in North District, Taichung City.

March
 30 March – The founding of Hitron.

August
 1 August – The opening of National Open University in Luzhou City, Taipei County.

September
 19 September – The completion of Yunlin Prison expansion in Huwei Township, Yunlin County.
 26 September – The closing of Sankuaicuo Station in Sanmin District, Kaohsiung City.
 28 September – The founding of Democratic Progressive Party.

November
 28 November
 The start of operation of Canadian Trade Office in Taipei in Taipei City.
 The reestablishment of Taroko National Park.

December
 6 December – 1986 Republic of China National Assembly and legislative election.

Births
 4 January – Cheng Shao-chieh, badminton athlete
 20 January – Genie Chuo, singer and actress
 19 February – Amber Kuo, singer and actress
 5 March – Chang Tsai-hsing, actor
 8 March – Amanda Chu, actress
 7 May – Pai Hsiao-ma, badminton athlete
 12 June – Alicia Liu, model and television personality
 8 July – Chloe Wang, actress, singer and host
 5 August – Chang Cheng-wei, baseball player
 6 October – Chiang Ming-han, football athlete
 12 November – Evan Yo, singer-songwriter
 26 December – Tseng Li-cheng, taekwondo athlete

Deaths
 25 February – Tu Tsung-ming, 92, pharmacologist.

References

 
Years of the 20th century in Taiwan